Eosynanceja is an extinct genus of prehistoric ray-finned fish that lived during the lower Eocene.

See also

 Prehistoric fish
 List of prehistoric bony fish

References

Eocene fish
Prehistoric ray-finned fish genera
Scorpaeniformes genera